is a former Japanese football player.

Playing career
Shuto was born in Oita Prefecture on June 8, 1983. He joined J1 League club Kashima Antlers from youth team in 2002. Although he played only 1 match in 2005 Emperor's Cup, he could only play this match behind Hitoshi Sogahata until 2006. In October 2006, he was loaned to Regional Leagues club Japan Soccer College with teammate Ryuta Sasaki. In 2007, he returned to Antlers. In 2008, he moved to J2 League club Mito HollyHock. However he could hardly play in the match behind Koji Homma. In 2010, he moved to J2 club Sagan Tosu. However he could not play at all in the match behind Taku Akahoshi and Takuya Muro. He retired end of 2010 season.

Club statistics

References

External links
j-league

1983 births
Living people
Association football people from Ōita Prefecture
Japanese footballers
J1 League players
J2 League players
Kashima Antlers players
Japan Soccer College players
Mito HollyHock players
Sagan Tosu players
Association football goalkeepers